Earlswood is a small village in Warwickshire, England in the Tanworth-in-Arden Civil parish of the Stratford-on-Avon District. However, the northernmost part of the village lies within Tidbury Green parish in the Solihull Metropolitan Borough of the West Midlands. A hamlet called Warings Green also lies in the south east of the village, with the northernmost point crossing into the parish of Cheswick Green in the borough of`Solihull. The village's postal code, B94, is in the Birmingham postcode area. It is in the ecclesiastical parish (Church of England) of St Patrick, Salter Street. The village is surrounded by farmland and forests and it gives its name to Earlswood Lakes (entirely within Warwickshire) as well as to Earlswood railway station (on the border with West Midlands), even though The Lakes railway station is located closer to the main part of the village.

Amenities

The Earlswood Lakes are close to the centre of the village. There are numerous footpaths for walking around the lakes and in the adjacent forest. It is possible to fish in some of the lakes and there is a sailing club. The village has a convenience store, village hall (also the home of the village museum), garage and petrol station. Earlswood is in the parish of St Patrick. The village is also home to Earlswood Town F.C.

Transport
Earlswood has a range of transport links. There is a limited bus service from the village to Solihull and Redditch, operated by Coventry Minibuses.

History
A brick church dedicated to St. Patrick was built at Salter Street in 1840 and the area formed into a parish in 1843. A tower with five bells was added in 1860 by Thomas Burman in memory of his father; and in 1899 the body of the church was rebuilt. The living, now known as Earlswood, is a vicarage in the gift of the vicar of Tanworth.

References

External links 

Photographs of Earlswood's Past

Villages in Warwickshire
Villages in the West Midlands (county)
Tanworth-in-Arden
Solihull